Kočarija is a settlement in the foothills of the Gorjanci Hills southwest of the town of Kostanjevica na Krki in eastern Slovenia. The area is part of the traditional region of Lower Carniola and is now included in the Lower Sava Statistical Region.

References

External links
Kočarija on Geopedia

Populated places in the Municipality of Kostanjevica na Krki